Sassetta is a comune (municipality) in the Province of Livorno in the Italian region Tuscany, located about  southwest of Florence and about  southeast of Livorno.

Sassetta borders the following municipalities: Castagneto Carducci, Monteverdi Marittimo, Suvereto.

History
Sassetta was an important castle of the Pisan Republic, demolished in 1503 after the Florentine conquest. In 1516 the original lords of the village, the Pisans Orlandi della Sassetta were also exiled. From the 16th century the village belonged to the Ramirez de Montalvo family of Spanish origin, who arrived in Florence with the court of Eleonora da Toledo who married the Grand Duke of Tuscany Cosimo I de' Medici.

References

Cities and towns in Tuscany